Samuel Goodman was an American rugby union player and manager.
In the 1920, and 1924 Summer Olympics, he managed the American Olympic rugby team, which won gold at both events.

See also
 Rugby union at the Olympics
 List of select Jewish rugby union players

References
 Encyclopedia Judaica, Second Edition, volume 19, p146

Year of birth missing
Year of death missing
American rugby union players
American rugby union coaches
Jewish rugby union players
Jewish American sportspeople
United States national rugby union team coaches